St. Charles Madras is a non-profit medical center located in Madras, Oregon, United States. Founded in 1967 as Mountain View Hospital, the level IV trauma center has 25 beds. It is the only hospital in Jefferson County and joined the St. Charles Health System in 2013.

History
Mountain View Hospital opened in 1967 as the lone hospital of the Mountain View Hospital District. Land for the facility was donated by the Bean Foundation. The St. Charles Health System began providing administrative services to the hospital in 1998. In 2010, the hospital announced plans for a $36 million remodel and expansion to the then  facility to be completed in 2012 without an increase in hospital beds. However, the expansion never materialized due to a lack of finances.

Instead, the hospital district sought to merge with the larger St. Charles Health System in July 2012. A deal was reached in October 2012 to merge the hospital, and the merger was completed in January 2013 with the hospital becoming St. Charles – Madras.

Operations
St. Charles – Madras has 36 licensed beds, but only has 25 available, and is the only hospital in Jefferson County. The acute care facility is a level four trauma center and serves the entire county, plus portions of neighboring Wasco County and the Warm Springs Indian Reservation. The state of Oregon classifies the hospital as a Type B Rural hospital and as a critical access facility.

Services at the facility include maternity, surgery, radiology, an intensive care unit, and emergency services, among others. For 2012, the hospital had a total of 814 discharges, with 3,113 patient days, and 10,737 emergency department visits. Also that year were 155 births and 172 inpatient surgeries.

See also
 Mountain View Hospital Heliport
 St. Charles Medical Center – Redmond
 St. Charles Medical Center – Bend

References

External links
 

Hospital buildings completed in 1967
Hospitals in Oregon
Hospitals established in 1967
Madras, Oregon
Buildings and structures in Jefferson County, Oregon
1967 establishments in Oregon